Plainclothes Man may refer to
A police officer wearing Plainclothes
"Plainclothes Man", a song from the 1996 album Mic City Sons
Plainclothes Man, a 1932 U.S. movie
Chelovek v shtatskom ("A Plainclothes Man"), a 1973 Soviet movie
Plainclothes Man, a character from the T.V. series The X-Files
The Plainclothesman, a U.S. TV series of the 1950s